The Cathedral of Mondoñedo is the Roman Catholic cathedral in the town of Mondoñedo, region of Galicia, Spain. It is of Romanesque and Gothic styles. Most of it built between 1219 and 1243. In the 18th century the facade was remodeled and the towers were added.

History
Construction began in 1219, and the church was consecrated in 1248. The facade shows a Gothic rosette window.

It was declared a national monument in 1902.

References

13th-century Roman Catholic church buildings in Spain
Romanesque architecture in Galicia (Spain)
Gothic architecture in Galicia (Spain)
Mondoñedo
Churches in Galicia (Spain)
Churches completed in 1248
Bien de Interés Cultural landmarks in the Province of Lugo